Property Virgins is a reality television series produced by Cineflix. The show portrays the experiences of prospective first-time home buyers, or "property virgins". The host of the show coaches first-time home buyers to adjust their dream home vision to a more realistic one that fits the market and their budget.

The program originated on HGTV Canada in March 2006 and expanded to HGTV in the United States in its second season. The program was hosted by Sandra Rinomato, a Toronto-based real estate expert, from its inception until 2011, and is now hosted by Egypt Sherrod, the founder of The Egypt Sherrod Real Estate Group. The series celebrated its 200th episode in March 2014, with Egypt Sherrod as the host.

Show information

Season one of Property Virgins focused exclusively on home buyers in the Greater Toronto Area. Subsequent seasons of the show have included both Toronto and major metropolitan areas in the United States, such as Dallas, Cincinnati, Miami, Washington, D.C., Richmond, Austin, New Jersey, Philadelphia, Boston, and San Diego.

Each episode runs 30 minutes, including commercials. At the beginning of each show, the host meets the prospective buyers in their desired neighborhood and asks them to guess the value of a house they like. The value of that house is usually above the customers' price range, prompting the host to reassure them that she will try to find a home in another neighborhood that meets the buyers' desired criteria. She usually asks the buyers to list some of the features they want in their new home, in order to give her a better idea of what to look for.

In a voice-over, the host briefly describes the neighborhood of the property she is about to show, then tells the viewer the square footage and asking price of the home. She meets her clients at the property for sale, then sends them in to tour the house. After they have toured the house, she answers their questions and asks them to guess the price. In most episodes, the clients are shown touring three different properties.

If the clients choose to purchase one of the properties, the host helps them decide on an offer and negotiate a contract. She also helps her clients understand other aspects of home buying and ownership, such as bidding wars, homeowners' association fees, down payments, closing costs, home inspections, and even renovations. The closing process, however, is not shown.

Not all potential buyers on the show purchase a home. A few of them decide to postpone home ownership, either because of relationship problems, financial issues, or other reasons.

Episodes
There are some differences between the Canadian and U.S. airings for this show. Since it is a Canadian show, the following episode lists follow the Canadian season designations, episode numbers, titles and airdates. Alternate U.S. info is given where known.

Season 1 (2006-07) 
 Note: This season was filmed around Toronto

Season 2 (2007) 
 Note this season was filmed around Toronto, Dallas, and Cincinnati

Season 3 (2008) 
 Note: This season was filmed around Miami, Toronto, Washington, D.C., and Richmond

Season 4 (2009-10) 
 Note: This season was filmed around Toronto, Austin, New Jersey, Philadelphia, and Boston

Season 5 (2010) 
 Note: This season was filmed around Miami and San Diego

Season 6 (2011) 
 Note: This season was filmed around Toronto

Season 7 (2011) 
 Note: This season was filmed around Toronto

Season 8 (2012)

References 

 [EgyptSherrodRealEstate.com]

External links
Property Virgins on HGTV Canada
Property Virgins on HGTV US
Property Virgins on LifeStyle Home

HGTV (Canada) original programming
2000s Canadian reality television series
2006 Canadian television series debuts
2010s Canadian reality television series
Television series by Cineflix